Tihomir Kanev (born 3 January 1986) is a Bulgarian footballer currently playing as a forward for Sevlievo.

Career
Kanev returned to Etar in January 2017, but was released at the end of the season. On 15 July 2017, he joined Third League club Sevlievo but actually signed with Litex Lovech a week later.

In June 2018, Kanev returned to Lokomotiv Gorna Oryahovitsa.

References

1986 births
Living people
People from Veliko Tarnovo
Bulgarian footballers
PFC Svetkavitsa players
FC Lokomotiv Gorna Oryahovitsa players
FC Etar 1924 Veliko Tarnovo players
FC Sozopol players
SFC Etar Veliko Tarnovo players
PFC Litex Lovech players
FC Pomorie players
First Professional Football League (Bulgaria) players
Second Professional Football League (Bulgaria) players
Association football forwards
Sportspeople from Veliko Tarnovo Province